George Ernest Jeffery (9 February 1853 – 8 April 1891) was an English cricketer active from 1872 to 1874 who played for Sussex. He was born in Eastbourne and died in Streatham Common. He appeared in 31 first-class matches as a righthanded batsman who bowled roundarm slow. He scored 808 runs with a highest score of 127 and took 68 wickets with a best performance of eight for 44.

Jeffery was educated at Rugby School and Trinity College, Cambridge. He was admitted to Lincoln's Inn in 1873 before graduating LLB in 1875. He was called to the Bar in 1878.

Notes

1853 births
1891 deaths
People educated at Rugby School
Alumni of Trinity College, Cambridge
English barristers
English cricketers
Sussex cricketers
Cambridge University cricketers
Gentlemen of England cricketers
19th-century English lawyers